Maurício Borges Almeida Silva (born 4 February 1989) is a Brazilian professional volleyball player, a former member of the Brazil national team. He is the 2016 Olympic Champion, a silver medallist at the 2014 World Championship, 2019 World Cup winner, and a two–time South American Champion (2013, 2017). At the professional club level, he plays for Asseco Resovia.

Honours

Clubs
 FIVB Club World Championship
  Doha 2012 – with Sada Cruzeiro

 CSV South American Club Championship
  Linares 2012 – with Sada Cruzeiro

 National championships
 2006/2007  Brazilian Championship, with Minas Tênis Clube
 2011/2012  Brazilian Championship, with Sada Cruzeiro
 2020/2021  Brazilian SuperCup, with Vôlei Taubaté

Youth national team
 2006  CSV U19 South American Championship
 2008  CSV U21 South American Championship
 2009  FIVB U21 World Championship

Individual awards
 2009: FIVB U21 World Championship – Most Valuable Player
 2017: CSV South American Championship – Most Valuable Player
 2019: Memorial of Hubert Jerzy Wagner – Best Receiver

References

External links

 
 
 
 Player profile at Volleybox.net

1989 births
Living people
People from Maceió
Sportspeople from Alagoas
Brazilian men's volleyball players
Olympic volleyball players of Brazil
Olympic medalists in volleyball
Olympic gold medalists for Brazil
Volleyball players at the 2016 Summer Olympics
Volleyball players at the 2020 Summer Olympics
Medalists at the 2016 Summer Olympics
Pan American Games medalists in volleyball
Pan American Games gold medalists for Brazil
Pan American Games silver medalists for Brazil
Volleyball players at the 2011 Pan American Games
Medalists at the 2011 Pan American Games
Volleyball players at the 2015 Pan American Games
Medalists at the 2015 Pan American Games
Brazilian expatriate sportspeople in Russia
Expatriate volleyball players in Russia
Brazilian expatriate sportspeople in Turkey
Expatriate volleyball players in Turkey
Brazilian expatriate sportspeople in Poland
Expatriate volleyball players in Poland
Arkas Spor volleyball players
Czarni Radom players
Resovia (volleyball) players
Outside hitters